The Château de Dampierre is a castle in Dampierre-en-Yvelines, in the Vallée de Chevreuse, France.

Built by Jules Hardouin-Mansart in 1675–1683 for the duc de Chevreuse,  Colbert's son-in-law, it is a French Baroque château of medium size. Protected behind fine wrought iron double gates, the main block (corps de logis) and its outbuildings, linked by balustrades, are ranged symmetrically around a dry paved and gravelled cour d'honneur. Behind, the central axis is extended between the former parterres, now mown hay. The park with formally shaped water was laid out by André Le Nôtre. There are sumptuous interiors. The small scale (compared to Vaux-le-Vicomte for example) makes it easier to compare it to the approximately contemporary Het Loo, for William III of Orange.

The grande galerie was reconstructed for the amateur archaeologist and collector,  Honoré Théodoric d'Albert de Luynes, under the direction of antiquarian architect Félix Duban. Sculptor Pierre-Charles Simart contributed Hellenic friezes and reliefs for the project.  Ingres' Age of Gold remains as testament to the abortive project of decorating it in fresco, not Ingres' habitual medium.

The park, which lost many trees in the storm of 26 December 1999, offers a formal canal and an eighteenth-century garden folly.

See also 
 List of Baroque residences

References 

Baroque buildings in France
Châteaux in Yvelines
Gardens in Yvelines
Historic house museums in Île-de-France
Houses completed in 1683
Museums in Yvelines
1683 establishments in France